Kuznetsk Alatau is a mountain range in southern Siberia, Russia. The range rises in the Altai-Sayan region of the South Siberian Mountains, northwest of Mongolia. The Siberian Railway skirts the northern limit of the range.

Aeroflot Flight 593 crashed in the Kuznetsk Alatau mountain range in 1994.

Geography
The  Abakan Range is at the southern limit and to the north the range descends gradually to the West Siberian Plain. To the east lies the basin of the Yenisei. The mountains have generally a smooth outline with rather steep western slopes and gentler eastern ones.

The range is composed mainly of metamorphic rocks rich in iron, manganese, nephelines, and gold.

Flora
The Siberian fir overwhelmingly predominates in the forest belt except for its upper part where, at the tree line (1300–1900 m), the siberian pine becomes dominant. The highlands are occupied mostly by vast large-stoned screes, and also by patches of subalpine meadows and, on some southern mountain massifs, of bushy, lichen and moss tundras. The basin of the Kondoma River in Gornaya Shoriya is remarkable for the Siberian lime-tree woods which are thought to be the relics of a pre-Pleistocene nemoral vegetation of Siberia. All over the upland, the forest openings are occupied by long forb forest meadows.

See also
Kuznetsk Alatau Nature Reserve
Geography of South-Central Siberia

References

External links

Mountain ranges of Russia
Landforms of Kemerovo Oblast
Landforms of Khakassia
South Siberian Mountains